Ascension Michigan, formerly St. John Providence Health System and the St. John Health System, is the Michigan division of Ascension Health.

It was its own non-profit corporation that owned and operated four hospitals and over 125 medical facilities in the U.S. state of Michigan. Its headquarters were in the St. John Providence Corporate Services Building in Warren in Metro Detroit. The parent company of St. John Providence is Ascension in St. Louis.

The organization had more than 18,000 employees and operates 2,033 licensed beds.

History

The system started in 1999 with the merger of the Providence Health System and the St. John Health System into the St. John Health System due to the merger of the two systems' respective Roman Catholic congregation sponsors, the Daughters of Charity and the Sisters of St. Joseph, into Ascension Health. The St. John Hospital System, under Anthony R. Tersigni, grew from four to ten hospitals. In May 2000 he was appointed as the senior vice president of Ascension Health's Great Lakes Division.

By 2001, the Emergency Center staff was treating more than 76,400 patients as a major level-two emergency center for the east side community.

In 2003 the hospital stated that it expected to have a $40 million loss for its 2004 fiscal year. In 2003 the system supported a proposed Michigan law that would allow the state health systems to move more hospital beds from Detroit to the suburbs.

In 2008 the system had 18,000 employees. On April 8 of that year Patricia A. Maryland, the system CEO, announced that as part of an $85 million cost cutting restructuring, the company planned to lay off 300 non-clinical workers with almost 50 management positions being cut. She also announced that the system would not fill 100 job vacancies, including 40 vacancies for management positions.

In 2010 St. John Health System was renamed to the St. John Providence Health System. The organization officials stated that "Providence" was added to the name in order to reflect the system's "spiritually centered patient care experience".

In 2018 the system was renamed Ascension Michigan as it had been acquired by Ascension Health. Accordingly, the names of the hospitals changed to their current names.

Predecessor systems
In 1910 the Providence Hospital opened in Detroit. The Sisters of St. Joseph built St. John Hospital in 1952, with 250 beds and 70 employees on Moross Road at the old Beaupre farm in a section called the “widow’s dower.” Work on the hospital began immediately following the groundbreaking ceremony on March 8, 1948, the feast of St. John of God (who in 1540 established a house to harbor poor and sick persons). Four-and-a-half year old Brenda Kay Earle was the hospital's first patient on May 15, 1952. Also in that year, Randall John Stewart was the first baby born there.  In 2006, there were 4,900 employees and a 700-member medical staff. The hospital's Emergency Room treated 8,287 patients during 1956, its first year.  Fr. Solanus Casey,  the first United States-born man to be declared "venerable" by the Roman Catholic Church, died on July 31, 1957, in St. John Hospital (in Room 305 of the old wing, which has a plaque outside the door) at the age of 86.

In the 1960s Providence Hospital moved to Southfield.

The Men's Guild began in 1948 and is believed to have been the first men's hospital fund raising group in the United States.  It has 750 members that support its philanthropic efforts, highlighted by the Annual Guild Dinner.

Hospitals
Ascension Michigan operates the following hospitals:

 Ascension St. John Hospital (formerly St. John Hospital & Medical Center)  
 Ascension Macomb-Oakland Hospital (formerly St. John Macomb-Oakland Hospital), Warren Campus (Warren) 
 St. John Macomb Hospital and St. John Oakland Hospital merged in 2007.
 Ascension Macomb-Oakland Hospital (formerly St. John Macomb-Oakland Hospital), Madison Heights Campus (Madison Heights) 
 Ascension Providence Hospital, Southfield Campus (formerly Providence-Providence Park Hospital), Southfield
 Ascension Providence Hospital, Novi Campus (formerly St. John Providence Park Hospital), Novi
 Ascension Providence Rochester Hospital, (Rochester Hills) (formerly Crittenton Hospital Medical Center)
 Ascension River District Hospital (formerly St. John River District Hospital) (East China Township) 
 Ascension Brighton Center for Recovery (formerly Brighton Center for Recovery) (Brighton Township) 
 Ascension Borgess Hospital (Kalamazoo)
 Ascension Genesys Hospital (formerly Genesys Regional Medical Center) (Grand Blanc Township)
 Ascension St. Joseph Hospital (formerly St. Joseph Health System)
 Ascension St. Mary's Hospital (formerly St. Mary's of Michigan Medical Center) - Saginaw
 Ascension Standish Hospital (formerly St. Mary's of Michigan Standish Hospital) - Arenac County

St. John previously operated the St. John NorthEast Community Hospital in Detroit. It had 295 beds. By 2003 the health system stated that it will remake the hospital into an outpatient center. In 2003 The Holy Cross Foundation made an initial offer to buy the hospital. The St. John System rejected the initial offer and stated that it still planned to remake the hospital, but the Holy Cross Foundation planned to make another offer.

In 2007 the St. John Riverview Hospital in Detroit closed. In 2011 the system sold the St. John Senior Community Center and the closed Riverview Hospital, both in Detroit, to DRSN, an investment group.

Child health care
St. John Hospital's Neonatal Intensive Care Unit (NICU) opened in 1970. St. John is also a regional referral center for high-risk pregnancies. In 1952 there were 855 births took place in the first delivery rooms back versus 3,893 in 2001 at the St. John Birthing Center. The facility is able to serve 31 mothers, infants and families for labor, delivery, recovery and postpartum care.

Surgery
St. John offers diagnostic, surgical and non-surgical cardiac treatment. The first laparoscopic gallbladder removal procedure in Michigan was performed in 1989 at St. John. The Transplant Specialty Center opened in 1990 and in 1992 the first pancreas transplant took place.
In 1993, the first kidney removal using a laparoscope was performed. Before the end of 2000, the Transplant Specialty Center had performed its 500th organ transplant.

Cancer care

The St. John Hospital and Medical Center Oncology Department began in 1968 and is now located in the recently opened Van Elslander Cancer Center (VECC) on the hospital's campus. The  facility focuses on offering holistic treatment and conventional cancer therapies.

Affiliated with the University of Michigan Cancer Center Network, the VanElslander Cancer Center, along with the University of Michigan and other St. John Health System hospitals treats more than 14,000 new cancer cases every year.

Medical education
St. John Providence teaching hospitals educate new physicians in family medicine, general surgery, internal medicine, OB/GYN, radiology, pathology, pediatrics, podiatric surgery and emergency medicine for physicians' post-medical school training, plus residency in Pharmacy Practices for post-degree students. In addition, St. John serves as a practical training site for students of Nursing, Pharmacy, Medical Laboratory Science, and Physical and Occupational Therapy, among others.

References

Further reading
Greene, Jay. "Physicians, St. John Providence form ACO, gain contracting power." Crain's Detroit Business. October 23, 2013.

External links

 
 
 
 

Hospital buildings completed in 1952
Economy of Detroit
Catholic hospitals in North America
Hospitals in Michigan